Samarinești is a commune in Gorj County, Oltenia, Romania. It is composed of nine villages: Băzăvani, Boca, Duculești, Larga, Samarinești, Țirioi, Valea Bisericii, Valea Mică, Valea Poienii.

References

Communes in Gorj County
Localities in Oltenia